

U

U